Chang Kee Jung is a physicist and professor at Stony Brook University. He was recognized as a State University of New York (SUNY) Distinguished Professor in 2015, and received a SUNY Chancellor's Award for Excellence in Scholarship and Creative Activities in 2014.

Early life 
Chang Kee Jung was born in Daegu, South Korea, and moved to Seoul around age 10. He graduated from Seoul High School in 1973, and completed his B.S. in physics at Seoul National University in 1979, with a brief interruption for mandatory military service from 1976 to 1977. During his undergraduate period, Jung was an avid member of the Seoul National University College of Liberal Arts and Sciences Alpine Club. In 1980, Jung moved to the U.S. to enroll in a Ph.D. program at Indiana University in Bloomington, Indiana. While enrolled in the university he also studied music and music composition. Jung received his Ph.D. specializing in Experimental High Energy Physics from Indiana in 1986.

Academic career 
Jung became a research associate (postdoc) at the Stanford Liner Accelerator (SLAC) in 1986. He became an assistant professor at Stony Brook University in 1990, gaining full-professorship in 2000, and becoming a SUNY Distinguished Professor in 2015.

Research  
From 1986 to 1990, Jung completed his postdoctoral research at SLAC, Stanford University, working on the HRS Experiment, PEP, and the MarkII Experiment, SLC. In 1991 he joined the Super-Kamiokande (SK) experiment and established Stony Brook Nucleon decay and Neutrino (NN) Group. The group was part of a coalition that participated in the Super-Kamiokande experiment, which led to the discovery of the neutrino oscillation phenomenon. This work was awarded the Nobel Prize in Physics in 2015. Jung has served on the boards and committees of several Neutrino and Nucleon Decay experiments, including his role as Co-Spokesperson for the K2K US Collaboration and the International Co-Spokesperson for the T2K Collaboration. All three experiments (Super-Kamiokande, K2K and T2K) were awarded Breakthrough Prize in Fundamental Physics in 2016.

Presently, Jung is the spokesperson for the T2K US Collaboration and the Founder & Chair of the Steering Committee for the Next generation Nucleon decay and Neutrino detectors (NNN) Workshop Series. He is also working on the Deep Underground Neutrino Experiment.

He was elected a  Fellow of the American Physical Society in 2002.

The Physics of Sports 
Jung has been committed to spreading knowledge of physics to non-science majors and the public throughout his teaching career. He introduced two courses targeted at non-science majors at Stony Brook University, titled "Light, Color and Vision" and "The Physics of Sports." The latter, created in 2003, was the first of its kind to be offered in the U.S. Jung's success with this course has since lead him to be sought out by sports news outlets, such as NBC 4 New York and ABC News. Notably, he has been cited for his scientific insight on the NFL deflate-gate scandal.

References

Year of birth missing (living people)
Living people
State University of New York faculty
21st-century American physicists
American astronomers
Fellows of the American Association for the Advancement of Science
Fellows of the American Physical Society
Seoul National University alumni